Evarcha armeniaca is a jumping spider species in the genus Evarcha.  It was first described by Dmitri Logunov in 1999 and is found in Armenia, Azerbaijan and Turkey.

References

Salticidae
Spiders of Asia
Spiders of Europe
Fauna of Armenia
Fauna of Azerbaijan
Arthropods of Turkey
Spiders described in 1999